Orthonops is a genus of North American araneomorph spiders in the family Caponiidae, first described by R. V. Chamberlin in 1924.

Species
 it contains 10 species in the southwest United States and Mexico:
Orthonops confuso (Galán-Sánchez & Álvarez-Padilla, 2022) – Mexico
Orthonops gertschi Chamberlin, 1928 – USA
Orthonops giulianii Platnick, 1995 – USA
Orthonops icenoglei Platnick, 1995 – USA, Mexico
Orthonops iviei Platnick, 1995 – USA
Orthonops johnsoni Platnick, 1995 – USA
Orthonops lapanus Gertsch & Mulaik, 1940 – USA
Orthonops ovalis (Banks, 1898) – Mexico
Orthonops overtus Chamberlin, 1924 (type) – Mexico
Orthonops zebra Platnick, 1995 – USA

References

External links
 Orthonops at BugGuide

Araneomorphae genera
Caponiidae
Spiders of Mexico
Spiders of the United States